Jessin Ayari (born May 31, 1992) is a Tunisian-German professional mixed martial artist. He was the formal Superior Fighting Championship Welterweight Champion. and competed in welterweight division of Ultimate Fighting Championship (UFC).

Background
Ayari started playing football when he was young, and played for TSV 1904 Feucht youth team as a defensive midfielder in Germany. He started training in MMA at the age of fifteen after becoming frustrated with his football teammates who did not pull their weight and give as much as him. Ayari soon transitioned to MMA and completed his first MMA fight two years later.

Since MMA gyms are hard to find in Germany, Ayari goes to different gyms to train in each specific combat sport discipline. A typical day for his training starts with strength and conditioning training at Power Athletics. In the evening, he either does boxing training at West End, BJJ training at Fight Gym, MMA sparring with Hammers Team or wrestling training at Johannis Grizzlys.

Mixed martial arts career

Early career
Ayari made his professional MMA debut on October 17, 2009 at Bavaria, Germany, and he was the former Superior Fighting Championship Welterweight Champion. He had a six fight win streak with a victory win over former UFC fighter Mickael Lebout at GMC 8 in Castrop-Rauxel on April 16, 2016, with professional MMA record of 15-3 prior being signed by UFC.

Ultimate Fighting Championship
Ayari was expected to make his UFC debut against Emil Meek on September 3, 2016 at UFC Fight Night: Arlovski vs. Barnett in Hamburg, Germany. However, Meek was pulled from the fight due to a USADA conflict where receiving medical treatment of the fight against Rousimar Palhares prior to signing with the UFC and he was replaced by Jim Wallhead. Ayari won his first UFC fight via split decision.

He next faced Darren Till on May 28, 2017 at UFC Fight Night: Gustafsson vs. Teixeira. After three rounds of fighting, the judges handed down the win to Till via unanimous decision.

Ayari faced Stevie Ray in a lightweight bout on October 27, 2018 at UFC Fight Night 138 He lost the fight by controversial decision.

Returning from an extended hiatus, Ayari faced Luigi Vendramini on October 4, 2020 at UFC on ESPN 16. He lost the fight via technical knockout in round one.

It was announced that after his loss to Vendramini, he was released from the UFC.

Championships and accomplishments

Mixed martial arts
 Superior Fighting Championship
 Superior Fighting Championship Welterweight Champion (one time) vs.  Kerim Engizek

Amateur Sambo Competition
 Bavarian Combat Sambo Championship
 Bavarian Combat Sambo Champion

Personal life
Ayari comes from a family of athletes; his cousin Khaled Ayari was a footballer for Lokomotiv Plovdiv in the Bulgarian First League, and another cousin Hassine Ayari and uncle Omrane Ayari represented Tunisia in Greco-Roman wrestling in the Olympics.

He worked as an automotive mechanic engineer prior to fighting professionally.

Mixed martial arts record

|-
|Loss
|align=center|16–6
|Luigi Vendramini
|TKO (head kick and punches)
|UFC on ESPN: Holm vs. Aldana
|
|align=center|1
|align=center|1:12
|Abu Dhabi, United Arab Emirates
|
|-
|Loss
|align=center| 16–5
|Stevie Ray
|Decision (unanimous)
|UFC Fight Night: Volkan vs. Smith 
|
|align=center|3
|align=center|5:00
|Moncton, New Brunswick, Canada
|
|-
|Loss
|align=center| 16–4
|Darren Till
|Decision (unanimous)
|UFC Fight Night: Gustafsson vs. Teixeira
| 
|align=center|3
|align=center|5:00
|Stockholm, Sweden
|
|-
|Win
|align=center|16–3
|Jim Wallhead
|Decision (split)
|UFC Fight Night: Arlovski vs. Barnett
| 
|align=center|3
|align=center|5:00
|Hamburg, Germany
|
|-
|Win
|align=center|15–3
|Mickaël Lebout
|Decision (unanimous)
|German MMA Championship 8
| 
|align=center|3
|align=center|5:00
|Castrop-Rauxel, Germany
|
|-
|Win
|align=center|14–3
|Twan van Buuren
|TKO (punches)
|Respect FC: Caged 2
| 
|align=center|3
|align=center|1:50
|Karlsruhe, Germany
|
|-
|Win
|align=center|13–3
|Stanislav Futera
|Submission (rear-naked choke)
|Innferno Fighting Championship
| 
|align=center|1
|align=center|3:22
|Tyrol, Austria
|
|-
|Win
|align=center|12–3
|Juan Manuel Suarez
|Decision (Unanimous)
|Ansgar Fighting Leag4e 2
| 
|align=center|3
|align=center|5:00
|Telde, Spain
|
|-
|Win
|align=center|11–3
|Ramon Boixader
|Submission (guillotine choke)
|Ansgar Fighting League 2
| 
|align=center|1
|align=center|4:56
|Madrid, Spain
|
|-
|Win
|align=center|10–3
|Roman Kapranov
|Decision (unanimous)
|Rhein Neckar Championship: Martial Arts Gala
| 
|align=center|3
|align=center|5:00
|Frankenthal, Germany
|
|-
|Loss
|align=center|9–3
|Abusupiyan Magomedov
|TKO (punches)
|German MMA Championship 3
| 
|align=center|1
|align=center|1:49
|Herne, Germany
|
|-
|Win
|align=center|9–2
|Kerim Engizek
|Submission (rear-naked choke)
|Superior FC: Tournament 2012 Part V
| 
|align=center|2
|align=center|3:56
|Manz, Germany
|
|-
|Win
|align=center|8–2
|Aleksandar Rajacic
|Decision (unanimous)
|Superior FC: Tournament 2012 Part IV
| 
|align=center|3
|align=center|5:00
|Düren, Germany
|
|-
|Loss
|align=center| 7–2
|Alan Johnston
|KO (punches)
|On Top 5
| 
|align=center|2
|align=center|2:52
|Glasgow, Scotland
|
|-
|Win
|align=center| 7–1
|Matthias Merkle
|Submission (rear-naked choke)
|Superior FC: Tournament 2012 Part 2
| 
|align=center|1
|align=center|2:09
|Göppingen, Germany
|
|-
|Win
|align=center| 6–1
|Sebastian Baron
|TKO (retirement)
|Respect Fighting Championship 6
| 
|align=center|1
|align=center|5:00
|Wuppertal, Germany
|
|-
|Win
|align=center| 5–1
|Volker Dietz
|TKO (broken hand)
|Respect Fighting Championship 5
| 
|align=center|1
|align=center|1:37
|Essen, Germany
|
|-
|Loss
|align=center| 4–1
|Ruben Crawford
|Submission (rear-naked choke)
|Outsider Cup: Cage Fight Night 9
| 
|align=center|1
|align=center|3:59
|Bielefeld, Germany
|
|-
|Win
|align=center| 4–0
|Wahid Beisel
|Submission (armbar)
|Outsider Cup 19
| 
|align=center|1
|align=center|1:58
|Berlin, Germany
|
|-
|Win
|align=center| 3–0
|Arsan Tepsaev
|Submission (triangle choke)
|Outsider Cup 19
| 
|align=center|1
|align=center|1:36
|Berlin, Germany
|
|-
|Win
|align=center| 2–0
|Frank van Lessiel
|Submission (arm-triangle choke)
|Outsider Cup 15
| 
|align=center|1
|align=center|3:06
|Koblenz, Germany
|
|-
|Win
|align=center| 1–0
|Tobias Hollubetz
|Submission (armbar)
|Fighting Masters Championship
| 
|align=center|1
|align=center|2:43
|Bavaria, Germany
|
|-

See also
 List of male mixed martial artists

References

External links
 
 

1992 births
Living people
Welterweight mixed martial artists
German male mixed martial artists
Mixed martial artists utilizing sambo
Mixed martial artists utilizing boxing
Sportspeople from Nuremberg
German practitioners of Brazilian jiu-jitsu
German sambo practitioners
German people of Tunisian descent
Ultimate Fighting Championship male fighters